Sexual Violence: Opposing Viewpoints is a 2003 book edited by Helen Cothran. It presents selections of contrasting viewpoints on four central questions about sexual violence: what causes it; whether it is a serious problem; how society should address it; and how it can be reduced. The book is part of the Opposing Viewpoints series.

Contents

See also
Sociobiological theories of rape

External links
Sexual Violence: Opposing Viewpoints at BookRags.com.

2003 non-fiction books
Books about rape
Books in the Opposing Viewpoints series
English-language books
Works about violence against women
Greenhaven Press books